Louise Mushikiwabo (born 22 May 1961) is the fourth and current Secretary General of Organisation internationale de la Francophonie. She previously served as the Minister of Foreign Affairs and Cooperation of Rwanda from 2009 to 2018. She also served as Government Spokesperson. She had previously been Minister of Information.

On 12 October 2018, she was elected for a four-year term for the position of Secretary General of Organisation internationale de la Francophonie (OIF) at the Summit of Francophonie in Yerevan, Armenia. She was re-elected in November, 2022.

Early life 
Louise Mushikiwabo was born on 22 May 1961 in Kigali, the Rwandan capital. Her father was Bitsindinkumi, from the Batsobe clan; Bitsindinkumi worked as a farmer, managing the family's smallholding as well as working as bookkeeper for a colonial coffee plantation. Her mother was Nyiratulira, a first cousin of the Abiru philosopher and historian Alexis Kagame. She spent her childhood in Kigali. The youngest of nine children, her siblings included Lando Ndasingwa, who became a notable businessman and politician in Rwanda before being killed in 1994 during the Rwandan genocide, and Anne-Marie Kantengwa, who took over Lando's hotel Chez Lando after his death and served in the Parliament of Rwanda from 2003 to 2008.

After completing primary and secondary school in Kigali, Mushikiwabo went to study at the National University of Rwanda (currently University of Rwanda), in the southern city of Butare, in 1981. She graduated from university in 1984, with a bachelor's degree in English, and then worked briefly as a secondary school teacher. In 1986, she emigrated from Rwanda to the United States, where she began studying for a master's degree in Languages and Interpretation at the University of Delaware, with French as her specialist language. Upon finishing her studies in 1988, she remained in the United States, settling in the Washington, D.C. area. She started her career working for lobbying organisations, before taking a position with the African Development Bank (ADB); as part of her role with the ADB she lived in Tunisia for a short time, and eventually became the bank's Communications Director.

In 2006, Mushikiwabo wrote a book, Rwanda Means the Universe, which was co-authored by Jack Kramer, an American journalist and ex-marine. The book is semi-autobiographical, describing Mushikiwabo's family history, her early life in Rwanda, and her experiences upon emigrating to the United States. It also describes the Rwandan genocide in detail, from a historical perspective as well as from Mushikwabo's own point of view living in Washington, as she received the news that many of her family members had been killed.

Political career

Minister of Information, 2008–2009 
In March 2008, Mushikiwabo was invited by Rwandan President Paul Kagame to return to her homeland Rwanda and take up a position in his government. She was appointed to the post of Minister of Information, replacing Laurent Nkusi. Early in her tenure, Mushikiwabo was responsible for deciding whether to take action against several local media organisations that had run defamatory stories about Kagame. One newspaper, the Kinyarwanda-language daily Umuco, had published an article comparing the president to Adolf Hitler, and the High Council of the Press (HCP) had requested the government to suspend the newspaper's licence. Nkusi had refused this request, and while Mushikiwabo did not officially suspend the paper, it nonetheless stopped printing in October 2008. Mushikiwabo generally encouraged her colleagues to support freedom of the press, but was also firm in ensuring that the media complied with Rwanda's tough laws surrounding genocide denial. In 2009, she issued a temporary ban on the Kinyarwanda radio station broadcast by the British Broadcasting Corporation (BBC), because she claimed it had aired programmes "giving free scope to genocidaires and negationists of the genocide"; the BBC denied this claim, arguing that it and the government had different interpretations of the genocide.

As well as being responsible for the ministry's decision making, Mushikiwabo also fulfilled the role of government spokesperson during her stint as Minister of Information. For example when Rwanda had a diplomatic crisis with Germany following the arrest of President Kagame's chief of protocol Rose Kabuye, Mushikiwabo spoke to the international media to clarify the Rwandan government's position. She made use of her linguistic skills, being able to give statements in all of Rwanda's official languages, Kinyarwanda, French and English.

Other activities
 Africa Europe Foundation (AEF), Member of the High-Level Group of Personalities on Africa-Europe Relations (since 2020)
 Munich Security Conference, Member of the Advisory Council
 International Gender Champions (IGC), Member

Personal life and family
Her brother, Lando Ndasingwa, was the only Tutsi minister in the last Habyarimana government, but was killed at the beginning of the 1994 genocide. Her sister, Anne-Marie Kantengwa, took over the management of their brother's hotel and restaurant, Chez Lando, after his murder. Mushikiwabo is also the niece of the distinguished Rwandan scholar and priest Alexis Kagame.

See also
List of foreign ministers in 2017
List of current foreign ministers
Cabinet of Rwanda

References

Cited works

External links

1961 births
Living people
People from Kigali
Female foreign ministers
Tutsi people
Foreign ministers of Rwanda
National University of Rwanda alumni
University of Delaware alumni
21st-century Rwandan women politicians
21st-century Rwandan politicians
Rwandan women diplomats
Secretaries-General of the Organisation internationale de la Francophonie
Women government ministers of Rwanda
Rwandan Roman Catholics